Psychoville is a British psychological horror-thriller black comedy mystery television series created and written by and starring The League of Gentlemen members Reece Shearsmith and Steve Pemberton for the BBC. It debuted on BBC Two on 18 June 2009. Pemberton and Shearsmith each play numerous characters, with Dawn French, Jason Tompkins, Daniel Kaluuya and Eileen Atkins in additional starring roles. The first series was followed by a Halloween special, broadcast on 31 October 2010, which saw Imelda Staunton and Jason Watkins added to the main cast. The second series was first broadcast on 5 May 2011 and ended on 6 June.  Reece Shearsmith has officially announced that there will not be a third series. 
In February 2020, Shearsmith and Pemberton's follow-up series, Inside No. 9, crossed over with Psychoville and brought back five of the characters for the episode "Death Be Not Proud".

Premise
The series revolves around five different characters from different parts of England: David Sowerbutts (played by Pemberton), a serial killer-obsessed man-child who still lives with his mother Maureen (Shearsmith); Mr. Jelly (Shearsmith), an embittered one-handed children's entertainer; Oscar Lomax (Pemberton), a blind millionaire who collects stuffed toy animals; Joy Aston (French), a midwife who treats a practice doll as if it is her real child; and Robert Greenspan (Tompkins), a panto dwarf in love with his Snow White who believes he has the power of telekinesis. All five are connected by a mysterious blackmailer who has sent them a letter each with the message: "I know what you did".
The series is named after the title given to The League of Gentlemen when the series was sold to Japan and Korea.

Plot
The series features a diverse set of five characters who live in different parts of England, all of whom have been blackmailed by the same individual (referred to in the credits for episode seven as "Black Gloved Man"), who has given them each a letter with the message "I know what you did…" In the second episode, the blackmailer leaves them a second message that reads, "You killed her". In the third episode they receive a videotape showing them in an asylum together (several having previously revealed that they had been institutionalised) performing "Close Every Door" from the musical Joseph and the Amazing Technicolor Dreamcoat. It is later disclosed that the institution was called Ravenhill Hospital. In Episodes Five and Six, the characters discover the final message: a key depicting a raven. At least David's letter also contains the message "I'm waiting...".

Ultimately it is revealed that Joy, Robert, David and Oscar were involved in the death of Nurse Edwina Kenchington (Eileen Atkins), who is the blackmailer's mother. The blackmailer is Dr. Stuart Strachen, a surgeon, who is also known as Mr. Jolly. Jolly blackmailed Jelly whom he blamed most, as he was operating on Jelly's hand (which was later amputated after the operation went wrong) while Kenchington was dying. David knocked her over and Joy pronounced her dead. The group started a fire to cover their tracks, but Kenchington woke up and attempted to escape. Oscar, Joy and Robert prevented her from leaving the room she was trapped in, but she somehow survived and returns to Ravenhill in the final episode looking for her locket. At the end of the series, Mr Jolly blows up part of the asylum with most of the main characters and Kenchington inside and it is revealed that Robert has the locket.

Series two begins with Mr Jelly, Oscar, and Oscar's assistant Michael, aka "Tealeaf" (A slang term for thief), attending the funeral of Mr Jolly. Afterwards, Jelly is given a box of Jolly's props, which also turns out to contain Strachen's mobile phone and his ID card at Andrews Nanotech. Posing as Mr Jolly, Mr Jelly discovers that Strachen was using his surgical skills to deal in the black market organ trade, and that Kenchington had an account with a cryogenic storage facility where her late father Ehrlichmann's head was kept frozen. Meanwhile, Andrews Nanotech has hired a police detective to retrieve Kenchington's locket by any means necessary. Robert gives the locket to Debbie for safekeeping, but after Robert's death, Debbie gives it away to make-up lady Hattie. Detective Finney tracks down the former Ravenhill patients, questioning, then killing, Joy, Robert, and Oscar, and attempting to kill Mrs Wren. Oscar's friend, toyshop owner Peter Bishop, deduces that Oscar was killed for his connection to Ravenhill.  He enlists Tealeaf's help with his investigation and they successfully retrieve the locket from Hattie before Finney can get to it, and contact Mr Jelly, whose own investigations have resulted in him taking possession of Ehrlichmann's frozen head. Bishop kills Tealeaf and travels to London with Mr Jelly to attempt to sell the locket and head to Grace Andrews. It is revealed that the method for restoring a frozen head to life, worked out by Edwina Kenchington, was microscopically engraved on the links of the locket chain, and using this information, Andrews' team is able to bring Erlichmann's head back to life. The head is subsequently destroyed, but the technique has been proven to work. The series ends with the revelation that David Sowerbutts is storing the corpse of his mother Maureen (who has died of cancer) in a bathtub filled with ice, suggesting that she could be resurrected by the same technique.

Web presence
Shearsmith and Pemberton collaborated with Rob and Neil Gibbons to produce fictional web content to accompany the show including an interactive treasure hunt. Fake websites and promotional websites were created for many of the characters to allow viewers of the programme to get "an overall Psychoville experience."

A new Psychoville Experience was created for series two, with a new interface and a selection of new fictional websites released after each episode. Viewers were asked to find a number each week and input them into a keypad to unlock a 'secret chamber' at the end of the series. The chamber once opened reveals the revived head of the Nazi Doctor Ehrlichmann (Kenchington's father). Five questions are asked and a certain amount correct gets you a free 'freeze and reanimation ticket' from CG Medistore and andrewsnanotech to print out.
The websites were again written by Shearsmith and Pemberton.

 Jelly Parties
 Jolly Parties
 Lomax Commodities
 Best Murders
 Joy's Advice to Young Mums Website
 Goldfish Bowl Productions
 Debbie Hart
 Hoyti Toyti/The Nazi Bay (type 'NAZI' in the valuation booth)
 Robert Greenspan
 Biggins Panto
 Midget Gems
 Murder and Chips
 Ravenhill Hospital
 Sunnyvale Rest Home
 FOCCE (Federation of Clowns and Children's Entertainers)

Cast

Principal characters

Supporting cast

Production
Filming for the series began at locations around London in October 2008, with plans for the show to be broadcast in 2009. In May 2009 it was confirmed that the series would begin on 11 June, although it was later rescheduled to 18 June. In order to promote Psychoville's launch, digital agency Ralph & Co created a customisable viral video, which enabled users to seemingly broadcast their friends' darkest secrets on a digital billboard at London's Piccadilly Circus.

Episodes

Series 1 (2009)

Halloween special (2010)

Series 2 (2011)

Awards
Psychoville won the 2009 British Comedy Award for "Best New British TV Comedy" and the 2011 British Comedy Award for "Best Comedy Drama".

References
General
 
 
 
 

Specific

External links
 
 
 
 
 Viral Promotion
 Fan Site
 The League of Gentlemen launch Psychoville, The Sunday Times, 31 May 2009
 Reece Shearsmith on Twitter (@RealReeceShears)

2009 British television series debuts
2011 British television series endings
2000s British black comedy television series
2000s British horror television series
2000s British mystery television series
2000s British sitcoms
2010s British black comedy television series
2010s British horror television series
2010s British mystery television series
2010s British sitcoms
BBC black comedy television shows
BBC television sitcoms
English-language television shows
British horror comedy television series